Spur 203 is a state highway spur near Presidio in Presidio County, Texas.

Route description
Spur 203 begins at Erma Avenue, signed as Bus. US 67-A / FM 170, in Presidio. The highway travels north for 0.77 miles before ending.

History
On May 25, 1954, the route began to be also signed as business US 75. This routing was decommissioned and removed from the state highway system on October 28, 1961.

This was signed as a business route of US 277.

Spur 203 was designated along its current route on June 18, 1996 as a replacement for the former routing of US route 67 north of Presidio.  Spur 203 was designated, along with former State Spur 310, when the old bridge between these routes over Cibolo Creek was removed in 1996. On January 27, 2003, Spur 310 was cancelled.

Major intersections

See also

References

External links

203
Transportation in Presidio County, Texas
U.S. Route 67